In mathematics, the Sugeno integral, named after M. Sugeno, is a type of integral with respect to a fuzzy measure.

Let  be a measurable space and let  be an -measurable function.

The Sugeno integral over the crisp set  of the function  with respect to the fuzzy measure  is defined by:
 
where .

The Sugeno integral over the fuzzy set  of the function  with respect to the fuzzy measure  is defined by:

 

where  is the membership function of the fuzzy set .

Usage and Relationships 

Sugeno integral is related to h-index.

References 

 Gunther Schmidt (2006) Relational measures and integration, Lecture Notes in Computer Science # 4136, pages 343−57, Springer books
  M. Sugeno & T. Murofushi (1987) "Pseudo-additive measures and integrals", Journal of Mathematical Analysis and Applications 122: 197−222 

Fuzzy logic
Measure theory
Definitions of mathematical integration